Charlene Pesquiera is a Democratic politician from the US state of Arizona. She served as Arizona State Senator for District 26 from 2007 until 2008, when she declined to run for re-election. She is currently the Justice of the Peace for Pima County Precinct Four, which she was elected to in 2016.

Personal
Pesquiera was born in Los Angeles, California and moved to Tucson, Arizona in 1971. She received and Associate's degree in Criminal Justice and Corrections at Pima Community College, a Pre Law and Criminal Justice  degree at Prescott College, and a Master's Degree in Business Administration from the University of Phoenix. She is also the co-owner of the National Institute of Contract Management, LLC.  Pesquiera is married to Garrett Burner and has a son, Korey.

References

External links

 Senator Charlene Pesquiera – District 26 official State Senate website
 Profile at Project Vote Smart
 Follow the Money – Charlene Pesquiera
 2008 campaign contributions

Living people
Arizona state senators
Women state legislators in Arizona
Prescott College alumni
Pima Community College alumni
Politicians from Tucson, Arizona
University of Phoenix alumni
Year of birth missing (living people)
21st-century American women